Ivie is a given name and surname. Notable people with the name include:

Given name
Ivie Anderson (1904–1949), American jazz singer
Ivie Okujaye (born 1987), Nigerian actress and television producer
Ivie Richardson (1895–1960), South African tennis player

Surname
 Bryan Ivie (born 1969), American volleyball player
 Joey Ivie (born 1995), American football player
 Larry Ivie (1936–2014), American comics writer and artist
 Mike Ivie (born 1952), American baseball player
 Thomas Ivie (fl. 1640s), English colonial administrator
 Wilton Ivie (1907–1969), American biologist

See also
Ivey (name), given name and surname
Ivy (name), given name and surname